Kumki may refer to:
Kumki, Arunachal Pradesh, a town in Arunachal Pradesh state of India
Kumki, Poland
Kumki (elephant)
Kumki (film), a 2012 Tamil film
Kumki 2, a 2018 Tamil sequel to the 2012 film